"Dress You Up" is a song by American singer Madonna from her second studio album, Like a Virgin (1984). It was released as the album's final single on July 24, 1985, by Sire Records. Written by Andrea LaRusso and Peggy Stanziale, and produced by Nile Rodgers, who also played guitar on the track, it was the final song to be added to the album. Rodgers had asked the writers to compose something similar to the work of his band Chic but, due to LaRusso and Stanziale being busy with other projects, the composition took time. When the lyrics were submitted, the producer initially rejected them, as he felt there was no time to compose a melody; Madonna, however, liked the lyrics and convinced him to included the song on Like a Virgin. Musically, "Dress You Up" is a dance-pop song whose lyrics are an extended metaphor for fashion and lust, comparing dressing up with passion.

Upon release, the song was positively received by music critics, with some deeming it "irresistible"; in retrospective reviews, it is now considered one of Madonna's best singles. Despite positive feedback, "Dress You Up" was added to the Parents Music Resource Center's "Filthy Fifteen" list due to the sexual innuendo on its lyrics. It fared well commercially, becoming the singer's sixth consecutive top-five single in the United States' Billboard Hot 100. Overseas, it peaked within the top-ten in Australia, Belgium, Canada, Ireland, New Zealand, and the United Kingdom. "Dress You Up" has been included in four of Madonna's concert tours, the last being 2015–2016's Rebel Heart Tour; the performance from The Virgin Tour (1985) was released as music video to promote its home video release. "Dress You Up" was used in a 1999 Gap TV spot, and covered by the cast of Glee in 2013.

Background and release 

Following the release of her 1983 self-titled debut album, Madonna became, according to author Craig Rosen, "one of the most exciting new artists of the 1980s". For her second studio album, Like a Virgin (1984), the singer attempted to become one of its primary producers, feeling the need to control the various aspects of her music; she believed that depending on a particular producer for an album was not something that suited or benefitted her. For Like a Virgin, she opted to work with Nile Rodgers because of his work as a member of band Chic, and on David Bowies Let's Dance (1983). She commented, "when I was making the record, I was just so thrilled and happy to be working with Nile Rodgers. I idolized Nile because of the whole Chic thing. I couldn't believe that the record company gave me the money so that I could work with him".

"Dress You Up" was the final song to be recorded for Like a Virgin; Rodgers had previously asked songwriters Andrea LaRusso and Peggy Stanziale to write a song for Madonna in the style of Chic but, due to other projects, the composition took time. When the lyrics of the song were submitted, Rodgers turned them down as he felt there was no time to compose a melody and record it for the album; however, Madonna liked the lyrics and persuaded the producer to include the song on Like a Virgin. "Dress You Up" was officially released as the final single from Like a Virgin on July 24, 1985; years later, it was included on Madonna's third compilation album, Celebration (2009).

Composition and controversy 

Musically, "Dress You Up" is a "drum machine-driven" dance-pop song, consisting of a two-chord verse. Personnel working on the song included Rodgers on guitars, Jimmy Bralower on drums, and Rob Sabino played piano and was in charge of the synthesizers. According to the sheet music published by Alfred Publishing Inc., "Dress You Up" is set in the time signature of common time, with a moderate tempo of 136 beats per minute. It is composed in the key of C minor, with Madonna's vocals ranging from a low-note of B3, to a high-note of F5; "Dress You Up" has a basic sequence of Cm–B–G7 in the verses, and A–B–Cm–Cm/G in the refrain as its chord progression. The lyrics of the song are a metaphor for fashion and sex; Madonna sings about clothes she would like to drape over her lover, so that she can cover him with "velvet kisses", and caress his body with her hands. According to Rikky Rooksby, author of Madonna: The Complete Guide to Her Music, the line "I'll create a look that's made for you", would go on to become synonymous with Madonna's re-invention of her image throughout her career.

In the summer of 1985, a committee known as the Parents Music Resource Center (PMRC) included "Dress You Up" on its "Filthy Fifteen" list, which compiled fifteen songs by multiple artists, considered to be the "most offensive" of the time". One of the committee's founders was Mary Elizabeth "Tipper" Gore, who said that "popular culture is morally bankrupt, flagrantly licentious and utterly materialistic ― and Madonna is the worst of all". Gore had allegedly heard her daughter listen to the song, and found the refrain an example of "vulgar music". The PMRC called upon the Recording Industry Association of America (RIAA) to give parents "consumer-friendly means" of identifying songs "unsuitable for minors", which resulted in a rating system based on lyrical content; in the case of "Dress You Up", it was given an "S" for "sex and obscenity".

Critical reception 
Upon release, "Dress You Up" was well received by critics. Billboards Nancy Erlich felt the singer sounded "pert, saucy, [and] eager to please" on the track. For Cash Box, it's "characteristic Madonna, with a bubbling groove and an irresistible chorus and hook". From AllMusic, Stephen Thomas Erlewine named it, alongside "Angel", an example of "excellent standard-issue dance-pop". On Slant Magazines review of Like a Virgin, Sal Cinquemani referred to "Dress You Up" as irresistible; Mandalit Del Barco from The Spokesman-Review deemed it a "groovy, albeit repetitive, ditty". Santiago Fouz-Hernández and Freya Jarman-Ivens, authors of Madonna's Drowned Worlds: New Approaches to Her Cultural Transformations, compared the singer to a "sex-kitten" in the song. William McKeen praised its melody for being "insistently chugging". Caroline Sullivan from The Guardian, opined that it was the artist's first attempt at a teenage persona. For the staff of Pitchfork, "Dress You Up" revisits the "effervescent electro-pop" sound of Madonna's debut "with a little more polish". One negative review came from Entertainment Weeklys Dave Karger, who felt the song came off as repetitive and immature.

Retrospective reviews have also been positive. In 2003, when fans were asked to vote for the Top 20 Madonna singles of all time by Q magazine, "Dress You Up" was allocated the eighth spot. On his ranking of Like a Virgins songs, Chuck Arnold from Billboard placed it in the third position: "[it] completely captures [Madonna] in the process of becoming a sex-positive icon. For a song that [she] didn’t have a hand in writing [...] ['Dress You Up'] sounds so much like her. Or at least the Madonna she was back in 1984". In another occasion, Arnold named it a "throbbing come-on impossible to resist". While reviewing the songs from the "Filthy Fifteen" in 2015, Rolling Stones Kory Grow said that "Dress You Up" was "largely innocuous by Madonna standards". Similarly, Matthew Jacobs from HuffPost added that, despite its inclusion on the list, "['Dress You Up']'s quite mild and quite fun"; he placed the song at number 39 of his ranking of Madonna's singles. It came in at the same spot on Gay Star News ranking, where Joe Morgan called it "her sexiest song that manages to appeal to both men and women of all sexualities".

For The Guardians Jude Rogers, "its mentions of velvet kisses over a body are gently diverting", and it is Madonna's 51st best single. Louis Virtel, writing for The Backlot, named "Dress You Up" the 38th best song of the singer's discography, referring to it as "silly and a little scandalous [...] it's perfect". It was named the singer's 21st finest single by The Tabs Harrison Brocklehurst, who singled out its "great hooky lyric", and deemed it a standout from Like a Virgin. "Dress You Up" was considered Madonna's 15th best track by the staff of Rolling Stone, who added that it became a "style anthem for a generation of young wannabe's".  Billboards Andrew Unterberger applauded its "knockout chorus, infectious synth line and exceptionally placed Owww backing vocals"; he named it the singer's 33rd best single.

Commercial performance 
On August 10, 1985, Billboard reported that "Dress You Up" was one of the most added songs to radio stations; this caused it to debut at number 36 on the Billboard Hot 100 just one week later. By September 7, the single had given Madonna her seventh consecutive top-ten hit, thus she became the fourth female artist with the most consecutive top-ten singles at the time, behind only Brenda Lee, Aretha Franklin, Connie Francis, and Donna Summer. "Dress You Up" was also the fourth single from Like a Virgin to peak within the Hot 100's top-ten, making it, at the time, the second album by a female to generate four top-ten singles, the other being Cyndi Lauper's She's So Unusual (1983). Ultimately, the single peaked at number five and was Madonna's sixth consecutive top-five hit. "Dress You Up" reached the third position of both the Hot 100 Airplay and the Dance Club Songs chart. It topped the Dance Singles Sales chart, where it spent four weeks. On the Adult Contemporary chart, it came in at number 32. "Dress You Up" was ranked at numbers 98 and 13 on the official Billboard year-end chart and the Dance year-end chart, respectively. In Canada, it was less successful, coming in at number 14.

In the United Kingdom, "Dress You Up" debuted at the 12th position of the UK Singles Chart on December 12, 1985, and, one week later, peaked at number five; it spent 11 weeks on the chart overall. The song was certified Silver by the British Phonographic Industry (BPI), for shipments of 200,000 copies. According to Music Week magazine, over 204,970 copies of the single have been sold in the United Kingdom as of 2008. In Australia, "Dress You Up" reached the chart's fifth position in October 1985, becoming Madonna's sixth top-ten single in the country. It entered the official New Zealand chart at number 28 on September 15, eventually peaking at number seven. The single performed relatively well across Europe, reaching the top-ten in Belgium, Ireland, and the Netherlands. "Dress You Up" saw less success in West Germany, France, and Switzerland, where it barely cracked the charts' top 20. In the European Hot 100 Singles 1986 year-end chart, it came in at number 91.

Live performances 

On May 16, 1984, Madonna performed "Dress You Up" at artist Keith Haring's birthday party, which took place on New York's Paradise Garage. She wore a leather jacket personally painted by the artist. Afterwards, it was included on four of her concert tours: Virgin (1985), Who's That Girl (1987), Sticky & Sweet (2009), and Rebel Heart (2015―2016). On the first one, it was sung as opening number; Madonna struck poses on top of a staircase before reaching the microphone to sing. She wore lace leggings, a lace bra, and crucifixes around her neck and ears. From the Observer–Reporter, Terry Hazlett felt the singer resembled Loretta Young during the number. To promote the Madonna Live: The Virgin Tour release, filmed in Detroit, the song's performance was released as music video and added to MTV the week of August 3, 1985; it was nominated for Best Choreography at the 1986 MTV Video Music Awards.

For the Who's That Girl World Tour, the song was performed in a medley with "Like a Virgin" and "Material Girl"; Madonna changed her clothes in an onstage telephone booth and emerged wearing a dress covered in toys, trinkets, and other plastic paraphernalia. The number was deemed one of the concert's strongest by the Washington Posts Richard Harrington. Two different performances were included on the videos Who's That Girl: Live in Japan, filmed in Tokyo on June, and Ciao Italia: Live from Italy, filmed in Turin on September. Madonna intended to include "Dress You Up" on 2004's Re-Invention World Tour, but found it hard to learn the guitar chords and was scrapped. On the Confessions Tour (2006), "Dress You Up" was used on an introduction video that led to "Music" (2000), along with "Borderline" (1984), "Erotica" (1992), and "Holiday" (1983). During the Philadelphia and Los Angeles concerts of 2008's Sticky & Sweet Tour, Madonna did a capella renditions of the single per the crowd's request. It was then included on the tour's 2009 extension, where it was performed as a "metal guitar-fest", with samples of The Knack's "My Sharona" (1979), and "God Save the Queen" (1977) by Sex Pistols. The number was singled out by The Guardians Alex Macpherson.

On March 20, 2015, the singer appeared on The Ellen DeGeneres Show to promote her thirteenth studio album Rebel Heart, and sang "Dress You Up" with host Ellen DeGeneres. Both women wore matching white bathrobes; while Madonna sang, DeGeneres added "cheeky" responses to the lyrics. That same year, a slow, cumbia and salsa-fueled medley of "Dress You Up", "Into the Groove", and "Lucky Star" (1983) was included on the Rebel Heart Tour. The number featured Day of the Dead iconography and found Madonna, decked out in a long dress with a black shawl and a black hat, joined by a Mexican-themed dance crew. Billboards Joe Lynch opined that "the maracas might have been a little much, but the crisp Spanish guitar successfully made the songs sound newly organic". The performance at the March 19–20, 2016 shows in Sydney was recorded and released in Madonna's fifth live album, Rebel Heart Tour (2017).

Covers 

In 1999, "Dress You Up" was used by Gap in a TV spot for vests, and sung by Alex Greenwald; the music was remixed by the Dust Brothers. In 2007, it was covered by American bands Apollo Heights, and Zolof the Rock & Roll Destroyer and Reel Big Fish; the former's rendition was included on the tribute album Through the Wilderness, while the latter's was recorded for Duet All Night Long. An additional cover was done in 2008 by British singer Kelly Llorenna. A mashup of Elton John's "The Bitch Is Back" (1974) and "Dress You Up"  ―performed by Blake Jenner and Alex Newell― was included on "Feud" (2013), the sixteenth episode of the fourth season of American musical television series Glee.

Track listing and formats 

 US 7" single
 "Dress You Up" (LP version) – 3:58
 "Shoo-Bee-Doo" (LP version) – 5:14

 Canadian 7" single
 "Dress You Up" (remix/edit) – 3:45
 "Shoo-Bee-Doo" (LP version) – 5:14

 US 12" single
 "Dress You Up" (the 12" formal mix) – 6:15
 "Dress You Up" (the casual instrumental mix) – 4:36
 "Shoo-Bee-Doo" (LP version) – 5:14

 Japanese 12" single / Reissue CD maxi-single
 "Dress You Up" (the 12" formal mix) – 6:15
 "Shoo-Bee-Doo" (LP version) – 5:14
 "Ain't No Big Deal" – 4:17
 "Dress You Up" (the casual instrumental mix) – 4:36

 UK 7" single
 "Dress You Up" (LP version) – 3:58
 "I Know It" (LP version) – 3:45

 UK 12" single
 "Dress You Up" (the 12" formal mix) – 6:15
 "Dress You Up" (the casual instrumental mix) – 4:36
 "I Know It" (LP version) – 3:45

 German and UK reissue CD maxi-single (1995)
 "Dress You Up" (the 12" formal mix) – 6:15
 "Dress You Up" (the casual instrumental mix) – 4:36
 "Shoo-Bee-Doo" (LP version) – 5:14

Credits and personnel 
Credits are adapted from the Like a Virgin album notes, and the 12-inch single liner notes.
 Madonna – vocals
 Nile Rodgers – producer, guitar
 Andrea LaRusso – writer
 Peggy Stanziale – writer
 Jimmy Bralower – drum programming
 Camille – background vocals
 Rob Sabino – bass synthesizer, acoustic piano
 Curtis King – background vocals
 Frank Simms – background vocals
 George Simms – background vocals
 Neal Preston - photography
 Jeri McManus - art direction (12-inch single)

Charts

Weekly charts

Year-end charts

Certifications and sales

References

Bibliography 

 
 
 
 
 
 
 
 
 
 
 
 
 

1984 songs
1985 singles
Madonna songs
Song recordings produced by Nile Rodgers
Sire Records singles
Warner Records singles
Obscenity controversies in music